Faraway may refer to:

Music
 "Faraway (Hoshi ni Negai o)", a song by Gackt, 2009
 "Faraway", a song by Jay Chou from Still Fantasy
 "Faraway", a song by Miz
 "Faraway", a song from Little Busters!
 "Faraway Vol.2", a song by Apocalyptica from Reflections

Places
 Faraway How, a nunatak in Greenland
 Faraway, two homesteads in Western Australia

Other uses
 Faraway: Puzzle Escape, a 2017 video game
 Faraway Farm, a historic home near Martinsburg, West Virginia, US
 Empire Faraway, a UK Empire ship

See also
 
 Far Away (disambiguation)
 Far Far Away (disambiguation)